is a Japanese politician serving in the House of Representatives in the Diet (national legislature) as a member of the Liberal Democratic Party.

Overview 
A native of Tsuruga, Fukui and graduate of Aoyama Gakuin University he was elected for the first time in 2000 after an unsuccessful run in 1996.

References

External links
 Official website in Japanese.

Living people
1956 births
People from Tsuruga, Fukui
Politicians from Fukui Prefecture
Aoyama Gakuin University alumni
Liberal Democratic Party (Japan) politicians
Members of the House of Representatives (Japan)
21st-century Japanese politicians